Alfred William Morrison (November 25, 1802 – August 24, 1883) was a U.S. politician from Missouri.

Alfred William Morrison was born in Jessamine County, Kentucky. In 1820, he moved to Howard County, Missouri. Trained as a surveyor by his stepfather, he served for a decade as Howard County Surveyor, where he was responsible for surveying sites which would eventually become the towns of New Franklin, Fayette, Roanoke, and Boonesboro. Other Howard County government posts he held included sheriff, assessor, and county judge. In 1845, President James Polk appointed him as receiver of the land office at Fayette, Missouri, where he served until 1849. Two years later in 1851, Governor Austin Augustus King appointed him as State Treasurer of Missouri, filling a vacancy caused by the death of incumbent Peter Garland Glover. His first wife, the former Minerva Jackson, with whom he had two children, died in 1858, during his tenure in office. Two years later, he married the former Martha Johnson. He served as state treasurer until 1861, when he resigned in protest of a new constitutional requirement to take a loyalty oath. Upon leaving office, he returned to his Howard County farm, where he lived until his death.

References
 Missouri State Treasurer Scott Fitzpatrick-Past Treasurer's Biography

1802 births
1883 deaths
State treasurers of Missouri
Missouri Democrats
Polk administration personnel
People from Jessamine County, Kentucky
People from Howard County, Missouri
19th-century American politicians